Kenelm Digby (died 21 April 1590) of Stoke Dry, Rutland was an English politician. He was first elected MP for Stamford in 1539 and Sheriff of Rutland in 1541.

He was born in Stoke Dry in Rutland, the eldest son of Sir Everard Digby and Margery Heydon, daughter of Sir John Heydon of Baconsthorpe, Norfolk and educated at Brasenose College, Oxford, and the Middle Temple. He should not be confused with his grandson, Sir Kenelm Digby (1603–1665), also son of a Sir Everard Digby (executed for taking part in the Gunpowder Plot), of Buckinghamshire.

He was first elected to parliament as MP for Stamford in 1539. He was then appointed Sheriff of Rutland in 1541.

He was returned as MP for Rutland (as senior knight of the shire) in successive parliamentary elections in 1545, 1547, 1553 (March) and 1553 (October), 1555, 1558, 1559, 1571, 1572 and 1584. He was also appointed Sheriff of Rutland a further six times in 1549, 1553, 1561, 1567, 1575 and 1585. He was custos rotulorum for Rutland from c. 1559 until his death.

He married Anne Cope, the daughter of Sir Anthony Cope of Hanwell, Oxfordshire; they had three sons and six daughters, including:
Everard Digby
Anthony Digby
John Digby
Anne Digby married Sir Edward Watson (–1617) of Rockingham, Northamptonshire.

He died 21 April 1590 and was buried in the church at Stoke Dry. His alabaster tomb chest in the chancel has recumbent effigies of Digby and his wife, with mourners on the chest sides.

References

Sources

External links
Tomb of Sir Kenelm Digby, St Andrews, Stoke Dry Flickr

1590 deaths
People from Rutland
High Sheriffs of Rutland
Year of birth uncertain
Alumni of Brasenose College, Oxford
Members of the Middle Temple
People from Stamford, Lincolnshire
English MPs 1545–1547
English MPs 1547–1552
English MPs 1553 (Edward VI)
English MPs 1553 (Mary I)
English MPs 1555
English MPs 1558
English MPs 1559
English MPs 1571
English MPs 1572–1583
English MPs 1584–1585